Micromphalia is a genus of gastropods belonging to the family Charopidae.

Species:

Micromphalia abax 
Micromphalia caledonica 
Micromphalia vieillardi

References

Charopidae
Gastropod genera